Thomas Bailey (1785–1856), was an English topographer and miscellaneous writer.

Biography 
Bailey was born in Nottingham on 31 July 1785. His education was received partly in a day school in his native town, and partly in a boarding school at Gillingham, Yorkshire. Afterwards he was for some time engaged in business as a silk-hosier. 

Politically liberal, he came forward in 1830 as a candidate for the representation of the borough of Nottingham, though was ultimately unsuccessful. In 1836 he was elected to the town council, and he continued to be a member for seven years. 

In 1845-6 he became proprietor and editor of the Nottingham Mercury, but his opinions were considered too temperate by his readers. The circulation of the paper declined, and in 1851 the mass of subscribers withdrew in protest at Bailey's views respecting the original error of the Ecclesiastical Titles Bill, and his prophecies of its inevitable failure. In the following year the journal declared bankrupt. 

In 1830, he purchased a mansion at Basford, near Nottingham, where he spent the later years of his life, engaged in literary pursuits and in the formation of a collection of books and engravings. 

He died at Basford on 23 October 1856. His son, Philip James Bailey, is the author of Festus and of other poems.

Publications 

 'What is Life? and other Poems,' Lond., 1820, 12mo.
 'The Carnival of Death,' a poem, Lond., 1822, 16mo.
 'A Sermon on the Death of Byron,' 1824.
 'Ireton,' a poem, Lond. 1827, 8vo.
 'Discourse on Political Revolutions,' 1830.
 'Recreations in Retirement,' a miscellany of poetry and prose, 1836.
 'The Rights of Labour,' a pamphlet, 1844.
 'The Advent of Charity and other Poems,' Lond. 1861, 16mo.
 'Annals of Nottinghamshire; a new and popular history of the county of Nottingham, including the borough,' 4 vols., Lond. 1852–55, 8vo, his most important publication.
 'Village Reform: the great social necessity of Britain.' being a letter to Lord Palmerston, Lond. 1854, 12mo.
 'Handbook to Nottingham Castle,' Lond. 1854, 8vo.
 'Handbook to Newstead Abbey,' Lond. 1855, 12mo.
 'Records of Longevity; with an introductory discourse on Vital Statistics,' Lond. 1857, 8vo.

References

External links
 

1785 births
1856 deaths
English topographers
19th-century English writers
People from Nottingham
19th-century geographers